Francisco Bernardo Arriagada Mella (born 31 January 1994) is a Chilean footballer who plays as an attacking midfielder.

Career
An attacking midfielder from the Huachipato youth system, Arriagada took part of Chile youth national teams from under-14 to under-17 level, coinciding with players such as Ángelo Henríquez, Igor Lichnovsky, andrés Robles, among others. After ending his contract with Huachipato in 2013, he emigrated to Europe thanks to a group of businessmen.

After tried to sign with Swiss side Lugano, he joined Maltese club Mosta in the Premier League. In Malta, he also has played for Vittoriosa Stars and Fgura United.

In his homeland, he has played for Deportes Limache in 2016–17 and Barnechea in 2019.

From 2020 to 2021, he played in Spain for UD Montijo, where he coincided with his compatriots Nicolás Clavería and Rodrigo Gattas, and UD Fuente de Cantos.

Personal life
He is nicknamed Pancho, an affective form of Francisco.

He married Constanza López, who is the niece of the former Chile international footballer Luis Jiménez.

References

External links
 
 
 Francisco Arriagada at Sifup.cl 

1994 births
Living people
People from Talcahuano
Chilean footballers
Chile youth international footballers
Chilean expatriate footballers
Mosta F.C. players
Vittoriosa Stars F.C. players
Deportes Limache footballers
A.C. Barnechea footballers
C.D. Montijo players
Maltese Premier League players
Primera B de Chile players
Tercera Federación players
Chilean expatriate sportspeople in Malta
Chilean expatriate sportspeople in Spain
Expatriate footballers in Malta
Expatriate footballers in Spain
Association football midfielders